{{DISPLAYTITLE:C18H21NO}}
The molecular formula C18H21NO (molar mass: 267.36 g/mol, exact mass: 267.1623 u) may refer to:

 Azacyclonol
 MBBA (N-(4-Methoxybenzylidene)-4-butylaniline)
 Pipradrol

Molecular formulas